Fudbalski klub Partizan is a Serbian professional association football club based in Belgrade, Serbia, who currently play in the Serbian SuperLiga. They have played at their current home ground, Partizan Stadium, since 1949.

This list include the major honours won by Partizan, records set by the club, their managers and their players. The player records section includes details of the club's leading goalscorers and those who have made most appearances in first-team competitions. It also records notable achievements by Partizan players on the international stage.

The club's record appearance maker is Saša Ilić, who made 800 appearances. Stjepan Bobek is the club's record goalscorer, scoring 425 goals during his career in Partizan.

Honours

Domestic

National Championships – 27

 Yugoslav First League
 Winners (11):  1946–47, 1948–49, 1960–61, 1961–62, 1962–63, 1964–65, 1975–76, 1977–78, 1982–83, 1985–86, 1986–87
 Runners-up (9): 1953–54, 1955–56, 1957–58, 1958–59, 1967–68, 1969–70, 1983–84, 1987–88, 1991–92

 FR Yugoslavia First League/Serbia and Montenegro First League
 Winners (8): 1992–93, 1993–94, 1995–96, 1996–97, 1998–99, 2001–02, 2002–03, 2004–05
 Runners-up (5): 1994–95, 1999–2000, 2000–01, 2003–04, 2005–06

 Serbian SuperLiga
 Winners (8): 2007–08, 2008–09, 2009–10, 2010–11, 2011–12, 2012–13, 2014–15, 2016–17
 Runners-up (3): 2006–07, 2013–14, 2015–16

National Cups – 16
 Yugoslav Cup
 Winners (6): 1946–47, 1952, 1953–54, 1956–57, 1988–89, 1991–92
 Runners-up (4): 1947–48, 1958–59, 1959–60, 1978–79

 FR Yugoslavia Cup/Serbia and Montenegro Cup
 Winners (3): 1993–94, 1997–98, 2000–01
 Runners-up (3): 1992–93, 1995–96, 1998–99

 Serbian Cup
 Winners (7): 2007–08, 2008–09, 2010–11, 2015–16, 2016–17, 2017–18, 2018–19
 Runners-up (3): 2014–15, 2019–20 ,2020–21 

Yugoslav Supercup – 1
 Winners (1): 1989

European

European Cup/UEFA Champions League
Runners-up (1): 1965–66
Quarter–finals (2): 1955–56, 1963–64
Round of 16 (1): 1961–62
Group stage (2): 2003–04, 2010–11

UEFA Cup/UEFA Europa League
Third round/Round of 16 (4): 1974–75, 1984–85, 1990–91, 2004–05

European Cup Winners' Cup
Quarter–finals (1): 1989–90

UEFA Conference League
Round of 16 (1): 2021-22

Mitropa Cup
Winner (1): 1978

Friendly Tournaments

 Trofeo Mohamed V (1): 1963
 Torneo Pentagonal Internacional de la Ciudad de México (1): 1970
 Torneo Pentagonal Internacional de la Ciudad de Bogotá (1): 1971
 Trofeo Colombino de fútbol (1): 1976
 Lunar New Year Cup (1): 1984
 40th Anniversary FK Partizan (1): 1985
 Uhrencup (1): 1989

Player records

Most appearances

Top goalscorers
All matches

Individual awards

Domestic

Yugoslavian First League top scorers

FR Yugoslavia First League top scorers/Serbia and Montenegro top scorers

Serbian SuperLiga top scorers

Serbian SuperLiga Team of the Season
2008–09 Mladen Božović,  Ivan Stevanović,  Nenad Đorđević,  Ivan Obradović,  Ljubomir Fejsa,  Nemanja Tomić,  Almami Moreira, Lamine Diarra
2009–10 Mladen Krstajić,  Marko Lomić,  Ljubomir Fejsa,  Radosav Petrović,  Almami Moreira
2010–11 Stefan Savić,  Stefan Babović,  Radosav Petrović,  Ivica Iliev
2011–12 Mohamed Kamara,  Zvonimir Vukić,  Stefan Babović,  Lazar Marković
2012–13 Vladimir Stojković,  Ivan Ivanov,  Saša Ilić,  Lazar Marković,  Aleksandar Mitrović
2013–14 Milan Lukač,  Miroslav Vulićević,  Nikola Drinčić
2014–15 Stefan Babović,  Nikola Drinčić
2015–16 Nemanja Mihajlović
2016–17 Miroslav Vulićević,  Bojan Ostojić,  Everton Luiz,  Uroš Đurđević,  Leonardo
2017–18 Vladimir Stojković,  Nemanja Miletić,  Danilo Pantić

2018–19 Nemanja Miletić

Yugoslav Footballer of the Year 
 Nenad Stojković (1978)

Sportsperson of the Year in Yugoslavia 
 Milan Galić (1962)

Sportske novosti Yellow Shirt award
  Stjepan Bobek (1954)
  Milutin Šoškić (1961)
  Vladica Kovačević (1963)
  Vladica Kovačević (1965)
  Nenad Stojković (1978)
  Dragan Mance (1983)

Young Sportsperson of the Year in Serbia and Montenegro 
 Simon Vukčević (2004)

Serbian Footballer of the Year 
 Predrag Mijatović (1992)
 Mateja Kežman (2000)
 Vladimir Stojković (2017)

Serbian SuperLiga Footballer of the Year
 Almami Moreira (2009)
 Uroš Đurđević (2017)

International

FIFA World Cup Silver Boot
  Milan Galić (1962)

UEFA European Football Championship Top scorer

UEFA European Football Championship Teams of the Tournament
  Milan Galić (1960)

European Cup and UEFA Champions League top scorers

Ballon d'Or candidates

  Miloš Milutinović (1957) 14th place
  Milan Galić (1962) 8th place
  Milan Galić (1965) 17th place

FK Partizan Player of the Year
Partizan's Player of the Year is a poll on the club's website, that is being held at the end of the year and fans vote for FK Partizan best player in the year. He was held from 2002 to 2013.

The Best Eleven
In 1995, Partizan celebrated half a century of its existence. Partizanov vesnik, official fan magazine, organized a massive poll in order to choose the best player and the best team in club's history, called Magnificent Eleven. The players chosen in the poll were:

Goalkeeper
  Milutin Šoškić (5.910 votes)
Defenders
  Bruno Belin (5.958)
  Velibor Vasović (5.496)
  Branko Zebec (5.218)
  Fahrudin Jusufi (4.300)
Midfielders
  Zlatko Čajkovski (5.244)
 / Predrag Mijatović (4.946)
  Miloš Milutinović (4.728)
  Momčilo Vukotić (4.558)
Forwards
  Stjepan Bobek (6.272)
  Milan Galić (5.058)

Players that participated on international tournaments while playing for Partizan

FIFA World Cup 
 1950 FIFA World Cup 5th place
 Aleksandar Atanacković
 Stjepan Bobek
 Zlatko Čajkovski
 Ratko Čolić
 Vladimir Firm
 Miodrag Jovanović
 Prvoslav Mihajlović
 1954 FIFA World Cup 8th place
 Zlatko Čajkovski
 Stjepan Bobek (Captain)
 Branko Zebec
 Bruno Belin
 Miloš Milutinović
 1962 FIFA World Cup 4th place
 Milutin Šoškić
 Fahrudin Jusufi
 Milan Galić (Captain)
 Vladica Kovačević
 1982 FIFA World Cup 16th place
 Nenad Stojković
 Zvonko Živković
 1990 FIFA World Cup 5th place
 Vujadin Stanojković
 Predrag Spasić
 Fahrudin Omerović
 1998 FIFA World Cup 10th place
 Ivica Kralj
 2006 FIFA World Cup 32nd place
 Nenad Đorđević
 Albert Nađ
 2010 FIFA World Cup 23rd place
 Radosav Petrović
 2018 FIFA World Cup 23rd place
 Vladimir Stojković

UEFA Euro 
 1960 European Nations' Cup 
 Milutin Šoškić
 Fahrudin Jusufi
 Jovan Miladinović
 Milan Galić
 UEFA Euro 1968 
 Milan Damjanović
 Borivoje Đorđević
 Blagoje Paunović
 Ljubomir Mihajlović
 Idriz Hošić
 UEFA Euro 1976 4th place
 Momčilo Vukotić
 UEFA Euro 1984 8th place
 Nenad Stojković
 Ljubomir Radanović
  UEFA Euro 2000 8th place
 Mateja Kežman
 UEFA Euro 2020 20th place
 Filip Holender

Summer Olympics 

 Football at the 1948 Summer Olympics 
 Aleksandar Atanacković
 Stjepan Bobek
 Miroslav Brozović
 Zlatko Čajkovski
 Miodrag Jovanović
 Prvoslav Mihajlović
 Franjo Šoštarić
 Béla Pálfi
 Football at the 1952 Summer Olympics 
 Stjepan Bobek
 Zlatko Čajkovski
 Ratko Čolić
 Branko Zebec
 Football at the 1960 Summer Olympics 
 Milan Galić
 Fahrudin Jusufi
 Velimir Sombolac
 Milutin Šoškić
 Football at the 1964 Summer Olympics 6th place
 Jovan Miladinović
 Lazar Radović
 Velimir Sombolac
 Milutin Šoškić
 Football at the 1980 Summer Olympics 4th place
 Nikica Klinčarski
 Football at the 1984 Summer Olympics 
 Ljubomir Radanović
 Admir Smajić
 Football at the 1988 Summer Olympics 10th place 
 Predrag Spasić
 Dragoljub Brnović
 Vladislav Đukić
 Football at the 1988 Summer Olympics 14th place (China ranking)
 Jia Xiuquan
 Liu Haiguang
 Football at the 2004 Summer Olympics 16th place 
 Simon Vukčević
 Branimir Petrović
 Srđan Radonjić
 Football at the 2008 Summer Olympics 12th place 
 Marko Jovanović
 Ljubomir Fejsa
 Zoran Tošić

Hat-tricks

Hat-tricks in European competitions

4 Player scored four goals

Hat-tricks in Yugoslav First League

8 Player scored eight goals
4 Player scored four goals
6 Player scored six goals

Hat-tricks in First League of Serbia and Montenegro (until February 2003 Federal Republic of Yugoslavia)

Hat-tricks in Serbian SuperLiga

Hat-tricks in Yugoslav Cup

4 Player scored four goals
5 Player scored five goals
6 Player scored six goals
8 Player scored eight goals

Hat-tricks in Serbian Cup

5 Player scored five goals

Eternal Derby
 First goal –  Stjepan Bobek (1st Eternal Derby, 5 January 1947)*	
 Top scorer –  Marko Valok (13 goals)

Managerial records
First managers: Franjo Glaser, from October 1945 to November 1946.
Longest-serving manager by time: Ljubiša Tumbaković, from July 1992 to June 1999 and from May 2000 to December 2002 (9 years).
Longest-serving manager by matches:

Cup finals

1 The match was abandoned in the 83rd minute with Partizan leading 2–1 when Vojvodina walked off to protest the quality of the officiating. Originally, this was declared the final score and the Cup was awarded to Partizan, but on 16 May 2011, after further investigation from Serbian FA concerning the match, the result was officially registered as a 3–0 win to Partizan.

Average attendance record 

 Match against Ponziana was played in Ljubljana.

Individual records and statistics 

 Most goals:
 In all competitions – 425,  Stjepan Bobek (1945–1959).
 In league matches – 126,  Saša Ilić (1996–2005, 2010–2019).
 In European competitions – 20,  Ricardo Gomes (2018–2019, 2021−).
 Most goals in one match:
 In domestic league – 9,  Stjepan Bobek (8 June 1947 v 14. Oktobar Niš).
 In European competitions – 4,  Miloš Milutinović, (12 October 1955 v  Sporting CP);  Vladica Kovačević (27 November 1963 v  Jeunesse Esch).
 First goal:
 Overall –  Silvester Šereš (6 October 1945 v Zemun).
 In Yugoslav First League –  Florijan Matekalo (25 August 1946 v Pobeda Skopje).
 In First League of FR Yugoslavia –  Slaviša Jokanović (23 August 1992 v Zemun).
 In Serbian SuperLiga –  Obiora Odita (5 August 2006 v Bežanija).
 In Yugoslav Cup –  Jovan Jezerkić (16 November 1947 v Proleter Priština).
 In FR Yugoslavia Cup –  Slobodan Krčmarević (16 August 1992 v Rudar Pljevlja).
 In Serbian Cup –  Marko Lomić (20 September 2006 v ČSK).

Landmark goals

Yugoslav First League 
 1000th –  Mustafa Hasanagić (9 December 1965 v Vardar).
 2000th –  Milko Đurovski (3 March 1987 v Sloboda Tuzla).

First League of Serbia and Montenegro 
 1000th –  Pierre Boya (6 December 2003 v Budućnost Banatski Dvor).

Goalscoring records in Serbian SuperLiga 

 Fastest goal – 10 seconds,  Uroš Đurđević (11 December 2016 v Čukarički).
 Most hat-tricks – 3,  Lamine Diarra.
 Fastest hat-trick – 18 minutes,  Nemanja Kojić (3 May 2014 v Donji Srem). 
 Scored in most consecutive matches – 6,  Uroš Đurđević (2016–17).
Youngest goalscorer – 16 years, 2 months and 5 days,  Dušan Vlahović (2 April 2016 v Radnik Surdulica).
Oldest goalscorer – 39 years, 10 months and 6 days,  Saša Ilić (5 November 2017 v Mačva).

Linglong Tire SuperLiga

Head-to-head with Linglong Tire SuperLiga teams

Matches with Crvena zvezda in Serbian SuperLiga

Big Four
Big Four was name for the four most successful clubs in Socialist Federative Republic of Yugoslavia: Partizan, Crvena zvezda, Dinamo Zagreb, and Hajduk Split.

Head-to-head with Big Four teams in First Yugoslav League

Head-to-head with Big Four teams in Yugoslav Cup

Records and statistics in European competitions 
 First match: Partizan 3–3 Sporting, European Cup, first round, 4 September 1955.
 Record (home) win: 8–0 against Rhyl in the 2009–10 UEFA Champions League, 21 July 2009.
 Record (away) defeat: 0–6 against Dynamo Dresden in the 1970–71 Inter-Cities Fairs Cup, 30 September 1970.
 Record (home) defeat: 0–4 against Beşiktaş in the 2014–15 UEFA Europa League, 23 October 2014.
 Highest-scoring: 4–5 against Celtic in the 1989–90 European Cup Winners' Cup, 27 September 1989.
 Most league goals scored in a season: 22 in 14 games, during the 2009–10 season
 Most consecutive victories at home: 7 (from 2–0 against Dynamo Dresden in September 1978, to 4–0 against Portimonense in October 1984)
 Most consecutive defeats at home: 3 (from 1–3 against Arsenal in September 2010, to 0–3 against Shakhtar Donetsk in November 2010)
 Most consecutive away victories: 2 (from 1–0 against Pyunik in July 2010, to 2–1 against HJK in August 2010)
 Most consecutive away defeats: 6 (from 2–6 against Queens Park Rangers in October 1984, to 0–2 against Flamurtari in September 1987)
 Most consecutive undefeated home matches: 11 (from 1–1 against Porto in September 2003, to 0–0 against Artmedia Petržalka in August 2005)
 Most consecutive undefeated away matches: 7 (from 2–1 against AZ Alkmaar in November 2015, to 0–0 against KF Skënderbeu Korçë in October 2017)
 Most consecutive unbeatable home matches: 5 (in 2 sequence)
 Most consecutive unbeatable away matches: 17 (from 1–2 against Jeunesse Esch in November 1963, to 0–2 against Dynamo Berlin in October 1983)

Club records

Matches

Firsts
 First match: Partizan 4–2 Zemun, a friendly match, 6 October 1945.
 First League match: Partizan 1–0 Pobeda Skopje, Yugoslav First League, 25 August 1946.
 First Cup match: Partizan 2–0 Proleter Priština, Yugoslav Cup, 3rd round, 16 November 1947.
 First European match: Partizan 3–3 Sporting, European Cup, first round, 4 September 1955.

Wins
 Record European win: 8–0 against Rhyl in the 2009–10 UEFA Champions League, 21 July 2009.
 Record league win: 10–0 against Borac Čačak in the 1996–97 First League of FR Yugoslavia, 27 October 1996.
 Record Cup win: 17–0 against Hajduk Beograd in the 1954 Yugoslav Cup, 18 August 1954
 Most league wins in a season: 31 wins from 36 games (during the 1992–93 season).
 Fewest league wins in a season: 9 wins from 34 games (during the 1978–79 and 1980–81 seasons).

Defeats
 Record defeat: 2–7 against Dinamo Zagreb in the 1963–64 Yugoslav First League, 20 May 1964.
 Record defeat at Partizan Stadium: 1–6 against Hajduk Split in the 1975–76 Yugoslav First League, 9 May 1976.
 Record-scoring defeat: 5–6 against Vojvodina in the 1997–98 First League of FR Yugoslavia, 29 November 1997.
 Record Cup defeat: 2–7 against Dinamo Zagreb in the 1963–64 Yugoslav First League, 20 May 1964.
 Most league defeats in a season: 12 in 34 games, during the 1979–80 season
 Fewest defeats in a season: 0 in 30 games, during the 2004–05 and 2009–10 season

Goals
 Most league goals scored in a season: 111 in 40 games, during the 1999–2000 season
 Fewest league goals scored in a season: 31 in 34 games, during the 1979–80 season
 Most league goals conceded in a season: 45 in 26 games, during the 1956–57 season
 Fewest league goals conceded in a season: 11 in 24 games, during the 1998–99 season

Points
 Most points in a season: 101 in 40 games, during the 1999–00 season
 Two points for a win: 54 in 34 games, during the 1977–78 season 
 Three points for a win:

 Fewest points in a season: 29 in 34 games, during the 1978–79 season
 Two points for a win: 
 Three points for a win:

References

External links
  

Records